TVNZ Heartland was a pay TV channel operated by TVNZ featuring only New Zealand made shows, mostly reruns of classic shows as well as more recent shows. While TVNZ channels are traditionally available free to air, TVNZ Heartland was only available to Sky Digital subscribers. The channel was broadcast on Sky Digital channel 17.

Heartland launched on 1 June 2010, 50 years to the day that TV broadcasting began in New Zealand. The first show introduced From the Archives, a compilation series of five decades of classic New Zealand TV shows.

In 2015, it was announced that TVNZ Heartland would permanently close down on 31 May that year, after TVNZ and Sky decided not to renew broadcast agreements.

References

External links
 TVNZ Heartland

Heartland
Classic television networks
Defunct television channels in New Zealand
Television channels and stations established in 2010
Television channels and stations disestablished in 2015
English-language television stations in New Zealand
2010 establishments in New Zealand
2015 disestablishments in New Zealand